Crocus vernus (spring crocus, giant crocus) is a species in Family Iridaceae, native to the Alps, the Pyrenees, and the Balkans. Its cultivars and those of Crocus flavus (Dutch crocus) are used as ornamental plants. The Dutch crocuses are larger than the other cultivated crocus species (e.g., Crocus chrysanthus).  Depending on the year, Crocus vernus starts flowering about the same time or up to 2 weeks after Crocus chrysanthus (snow crocus) starts flowering.  Height: 4–6" (10–15 cm).

Taxonomy
The Latin specific epithet vernus refers to both 'vernal' (spring) and 'crocus'.

Habitat
Within Britain, it can be found in grasslands, including churchyards and roadside verges.

Cultivars 

 ‘Flower Record’ (Blue)
 'Grand Maitre' (blue)
 ‘Jeanne d’Arc’ (Glistening white with an interior, dark purple base)
 ‘Pickwick’ (violet mauve, striped)
 ‘Purpurea Grandiflora’ (deep purple)
 ‘Queen of Blues’ (Ageratum-blue with paler margins and a dark base)
 ‘Remembrance’ (dark blue and purple)
 'Silver Coral' (White, purple base)
 ‘Vanguard’ (silvery blue/violet, light purple)

Synonyms 
Several other spring blooming species, among others Crocus flavus Weston (Syn. Crocus aureus), have been called 'Crocus vernus' by other authors.

Gallery

References

External links 

USDA Plants Profile: Crocus vernus
Gardening:Crocus vernus

vernus
Garden plants
Flora of Europe
Plants described in 1753
Taxa named by Carl Linnaeus